Rivaldi Bawuo (born 13 August 1993, in Gorontalo) is an Indonesian professional footballer who plays as a forward for Liga 1 club Madura United.

Club career

Kalteng Putra
In the 2017 season, Rivaldi Played for Kalteng Putra in 2017 Liga 2. On July 27, in a match against PS Mojokerto Putra, he scored a hattrick as his team eased to a 4-1 triumph. He finished the league as a top scorer with 17 goals, but he failed to gain a promotion to Liga 1 with his club as they failed to secure a semi final spot in Group X 2017 Liga 2.

Arema FC
On December 2017, Rivaldi Bawuo move from Kalteng Putra to Arema FC to play in Indonesian top flight Liga 1. He made his debut for Arema FC on 9 April 2018 against Borneo F.C. in 2018 Liga 1, playing as a substitute for Bagas Adi.

Madura United
On 4 January 2020, Rivaldi Bawuo move from Arema FC to Madura United. This season was suspended on 27 March 2020 due to the COVID-19 pandemic. The season was abandoned and was declared void on 20 January 2021.

Persis Solo
In 2021, Rivaldi Bawuo signed a contract with Indonesian Liga 2 club Persis Solo. He made his league debut on 5 October against Persijap Jepara at the Manahan Stadium, Surakarta.

PSS Sleman (loan)
In January 2022, Rivaldi signed a contract with Liga 1 club PSS Sleman on loan from Persis Solo. He made his league debut in a 2–0 loss against Arema on 13 January 2022 as a substitute for Wander Luiz in the 84th minute at the Kapten I Wayan Dipta Stadium, Gianyar.

Return to Madura United
In May 2022, Bawuo returned to Madura United on a year contract. He made his league debut on 23 July 2022 in a match against Barito Putera at the Gelora Ratu Pamelingan Stadium, Pamekasan.

Career statistics

Club

Honours

Club
Arema
 Indonesia President's Cup: 2019
Persis Solo
 Liga 2: 2021

Individual
 Liga 2 Top Goalscorer: 2017 (17 goals)

References

External links

1993 births
Living people
People from Gorontalo (city)
People from Gorontalo (province)
Indonesian footballers
Persigo Gorontalo players
Kalteng Putra F.C. players
Arema F.C. players
Madura United F.C. players
Persebaya Surabaya players
Persis Solo players
PSS Sleman players
Liga 1 (Indonesia) players
Liga 2 (Indonesia) players
Association football forwards